Mandeep Dhillon (born 21 December 1990) is a British actress who has appeared in stage, television, film and radio productions, including the BBC Three comedy series Some Girls and Fried. She featured in the British romantic comedy Finding Fatimah in 2017, and as Constable Lizbyet Corwi in The City and the City in 2018. She also appears as Sandy in the Netflix Original dark-comedy After Life, having previously worked with Ricky Gervais in David Brent: Life on the Road. Since 2021, she has starred in the American crime television series CSI: Vegas.

Dhillon performed in plays at the Bush Theatre, her first television appearance was in the TV movie Some Dogs Bite (2011), which was followed by roles in The Mimic and The Thick of It. In 2012, she had a leading role Saz Kaur in Some Girls,  and in 2015, portrayed Amara in Fried.

Early life
Dhillon was born on 21 December 1990 and grew up in Hertfordshire, the youngest of three children, brought up by her mother who was a social worker. Dhillon attended Wilbury Primary School and Fearnhill School, Letchworth.

In a 2019 interview, Dhillon said that as she was unable to afford acting lessons, she made sure that she participated in all of the school plays for experience. She also stated that soon after starting her A-levels, she dropped out of college, and joined a performing arts institution in London. Dhillon said in a 2015 interview that she decided to become an actress shortly before her 19th birthday, and started emailing agencies using contact details that she found on the Spotlight website. One of the agencies offered her a place on a workshop, following which she received an audition for Some Dogs Bite (2010), which became her first television appearance.

Career
In 2011, Dhillon played a school student in The Knowledge at the Bush Theatre. The production received a positive review in The Times, with Dominic Maxwell saying that "There [was] not a whiff of stage school" to the actors, including Dhillon, portraying the students. Also in 2011, at the Bush Theatre, Dhillon appeared in Little Platoons, a drama about free schools. A radio production featuring Dhillon and the rest of the original cast was broadcast on BBC Radio 4. The following year, at the same venue, she starred in Repentance, as a young Muslim woman conflicted about her romantic relationship with a non-Muslim. The Daily Telegraph'''s Charles Spencer felt that Dhillon gave a "touching performance" in a play that "potently catches the clash between faith and sexual desire". The Financial Times called Dhillon's performance "powerfully acted", and Time Out said she was "luminous".

After appearances in The Mimic (2011) and The Thick of It (2012), she starred as the character Saz Kaur, a sarcastic high school student from a strict Indian family, in Some Girls, which aired on BBC Three from 2012 to 2014. Dhillon went on to appear as a guest character in seven episodes of the 2014 TV series 24: Live Another Day, alongside Kiefer Sutherland. The low budget romantic comedy A Wonderful Christmas Time was shot over five days and released in 2014, with the actors improvising around scripted outlines. Dhillon was in the main cast as Mandi, a friend of the lead Cherie played by Laura Haddock. Screen International described Dhillon as "impressive" in its review.

In the pilot for the comedy television series Fried, Dhillon's character was called Anal. In the main series the character's name is Amara, and she is from a wealthy family, having got a job in a fried chicken shop at the behest of her family who want her to appreciate the value of money.

Dhillon's performance as Meena in the stage adaptation of Anita and Me, which played at the Birmingham Repertory Theatre and then the Theatre Royal Stratford East in 2015, was praised by Dominic Cavendish in The Daily Telegraph as one of the "spirited performances" given by the main cast, although he felt that the production needed further development. Michael Billington in The Guardian had a similar view, giving the play a middle-rated 3 stars out of 5, whilst highlighting the "good work" done by Mandeep Dhillon and her co-star Jalleh Alizadeh.

She auditioned for Ricky Gervais's film David Brent: Life on the Road (2016) and won the part of a receptionist after Gervais asked her what she thought of the David Brent character and she replied "he scares me." She appeared in the British romantic comedy film Finding Fatimah in 2017. Umbreen Ali in Asian Image gave the movie a positive review, saying that "the charismatic Nayna [played by Dhillon] delivers her dialogue with perfectly projected dramatic nuance." In 2017, Dhillon played the lead role as Krishna in the short film Garfield  and won the Actor Award at Underwire Film Festival.

Dhillon played the main character Constable Lizbyet Corwi in the four part BBC Drama The City and the City in 2018, alongside David Morrissey who played her police partner, Inspector Tyador Borlú. Dhillon said in a 2018 interview that she enjoyed the role and working with Morrissey, one of the reasons being that "To actually play a lead, a female lead, and to have a male cop and a female cop, and there not be any sexual tension ... we could have bants and have that good friendship vibe." She also spoke positively of her perception that the show used colour blind casting. The Evening Standard praised Dhillon's performance, and said that she "[stood out] as somehow simultaneously plucky and deadpan".

In the black comedy series After Life (2019–2020), Dhillon portrays Sandy, a journalist working for Tony, played by the show's creator, Gervais. The two characters form what Wonderland Magazine called "a compassionate and nurturing bond". The pair had previously worked together on David Brent: Life on the Road, and according to her account, he approached her at a Christmas Party and told her that he had written the role in After Life with her in mind. In 2019, she was in the films Star Wars: The Rise of Skywalker as Lieutenant Garan, and Songbird, a film, like A Wonderful Christmas Time, that was directed by Jamie Adams and included improvisation. The reviewer of Songbird in the Oxford Times lamented that Dhillon and the other actors were "talented performers ... saddled with such negligible roles". She played a "cat cleric" that worships the character Dave Lister in Red Dwarf: The Promised Land (2020). During the COVID-19 pandemic in the United Kingdom, Dhillon recorded a self-written monologue titled "Letter to My Future Self" in support of an initiative to raise money for the benevolent fund of the actors' union Equity, and starred in a short online film, The Forgotten C, based on the true story of a woman who died from lung cancer during the UK lockdown.

On radio, she participated in Newsjack in 2017, a show that features the cast performing material sent in by the public, and has appeared in leading roles in BBC Radio 4 dramas The Beard (2018) and Freezing to Death (and How to Avoid It)'' (2020).

Filmography

Film

Television

Theatre

Radio

Awards and nominations

References

External links
 

Living people
1990 births
Actresses from Hertfordshire
People from Letchworth
English film actresses
English television actresses
English stage actresses
English people of Indian descent
English people of Punjabi descent
British actresses of Indian descent
21st-century English actresses